Amha Records was an Ethiopian record label founded by Amha Eshete. The company released 103 singles and 12 albums between 1969 and 1975.

Prominent singers and musicians who recorded for the label included Alemayehu Eshete, Bizunesh Bekele, Mahmoud Ahmed, Hirut Bekele, Mulatu Astatke and Tilahun Gessesse.

See also 
 List of record labels
 Éthiopiques
Kaifa Records

References

External links 
Amha Records Discography

Companies of Ethiopia
Ethiopian record labels
Record labels established in 1969
Record labels disestablished in 1975